John Donald Mackenzie Brownlee (7 January 190010 January 1969) was an Australian operatic baritone. For most of his professional career he was based in Europe and then the United States.

Biography
John Brownlee was born in Geelong, Victoria. As a boy, he became a junior naval cadet in the Royal Australian Navy, serving during World War I. Following service, he studied accounting. He entered a singing contest in Ballarat, winning first prize even though he had never had a lesson. Several singing engagements followed. One of these, a performance of Messiah, was attended by Nellie Melba, who convinced him to go to Paris for serious study with Dinh Gilly. His debut took place at Covent Garden on 8 June 1926, in the performance of La bohème in which Melba made her farewell appearance. That autumn he was engaged by the Paris Opera, the first time a British subject had been made a permanent member of that company; his Paris debut was in Thaïs in 1927.

In 1934, he appeared as a singer in the British film The Private Life of Don Juan.

On 17 February 1937, he appeared for the first time at the Metropolitan Opera. The opera was Rigoletto. Besides making important appearances elsewhere, Brownlee remained a regular at Covent Garden, the Paris Opera, and the Met, making his last performance there in March 1957.

Brownlee's greatest successes were in the Mozart repertory, particularly at the Glyndebourne Festival. He was also acclaimed in Salome and Pelléas et Mélisande. In 1943, he starred as "The Vagabond King" at New York's Shubert theater. After retiring from singing, Brownlee became a stage director, making his debut at the Met on 27 November 1958 in a performance of Die Fledermaus.

Brownlee joined the voice faculty of Manhattan School of Music in 1953 and headed the opera department. He was appointed director (a title later changed to President) of the school, the second in the school's history, in 1956, leading a major expansion that included a successful $9.5 million fund-raising campaign and a move from the school's original East Harlem location to its current site at 130 Claremont Avenue in Morningside Heights.

Brownlee died in New York in 1969, and was buried in Ferncliff Cemetery, Hartsdale, New York. An Australian scholarship in his name was first awarded after his death in 1969.

Recordings
He can be heard on CD in the title role of Don Giovanni, and as Don Alfonso in Così fan tutte, both Glyndebourne productions with Fritz Busch conducting, as the Count in The Marriage of Figaro, and as Mercutio in Roméo et Juliette.

Personal life
He married former Countess Donna Carla Oddone di Feletto in Paris on 29 November 1928, and the couple had a daughter and two sons.

Notes

Further reading
 Encyclopedia of the Opera by David Ewen (Hill and Wang, New York; 1955)

External links

 
 John Brownlee – baritone, Brownlee memorial website
 Photographs, brownlee.com.au

1900 births
1969 deaths
Australian operatic baritones
20th-century Australian male opera singers
Manhattan School of Music faculty
Burials at Ferncliff Cemetery